Viktor Ivanovych Dyak (born 4 June 1971) is a former professional Ukrainian football and futsal forward who currently works as a coach in the academy of Shakhtar Donetsk.

Supposedly, in 2000 Diak also played for the Russian club FC Nemkom Krasnodar in the Russian Second League.

Diak became the second highest scorer after Serhiy Chuichenko when he scored 21 goals for FC Shakhtar Makiivka during the 1995–96 Ukrainian First League season.

In 2000–07 Diak also participated in futsal competitions playing for several futsal teams out of the Donbas region.

References

External links
 Profile at the Football Facts
 Profile at the All players (Ukraine)

1971 births
Living people
Ukrainian footballers
Ukrainian expatriate footballers
Expatriate footballers in Slovakia
Ukrainian expatriate sportspeople in Slovakia
FC Shakhtar Makiivka players
FC Metalurh Donetsk players
FK Dubnica players
FC Shakhtar Shakhtarsk players
FC Elektrometalurh-NZF Nikopol players
Ukrainian Premier League players
Ukrainian First League players
Ukrainian Second League players

Association football forwards